Tyler Catalina (born January 24, 1993) is an American football offensive tackle who is a free agent. He played college football at Rhode Island for three seasons before finishing his career at Georgia. He was signed by the Washington Redskins as an undrafted free agent in 2017.

College career
Catalina played collegiately at Rhode Island (2013–15) and Georgia (2016). He started 12 games at right tackle as a freshman in 2013. He then started ten games at left tackle the following season, garnering third-team all-conference honors. The next year, he started 11 games at left tackle as a junior team captain in 2015, earning second-team All-CAA honors. In his lone season at Georgia, he started 12 games at left tackle.

Professional career

Washington Redskins
Catalina signed with the Washington Redskins as an undrafted free agent on May 4, 2017. After a strong performance in training camp and the preseason, Catalina made the Redskins final roster. He made his NFL debut in Week 8 against the Cowboys, starting at right guard in place of an injured Brandon Scherff. He was waived by the Redskins on November 11, 2017, but was re-signed five days later.

On September 1, 2018, Catalina was placed on injured reserve after having shoulder surgery. He was waived on July 31, 2019.

Minnesota Vikings
On August 1, 2019, Catalina was claimed off waivers by the Minnesota Vikings, but was waived ten days later.

Carolina Panthers
On August 19, 2019, Catalina was signed by the Carolina Panthers. He was waived during final roster cuts on August 30, 2019.

Ottawa Redblacks
Catalina signed with the Ottawa Redblacks on February 18, 2020. After the CFL canceled the 2020 season due to the COVID-19 pandemic, Catalina chose to opt-out of his contract with the Redblacks on September 3, 2020. He re-signed with the Redblacks on February 5, 2021.

Tampa Bay Bandits
Catalina was selected by the Tampa Bay Bandits on February 22, 2022, with the eighth pick of the fifth round of the 2022 USFL Draft.

DC Defenders 
On January 1, 2023, Catalina was selected by the DC Defenders in the fifth round of the 2023 XFL Supplemental Draft.

References

External links
Washington Redskins bio

1993 births
Living people
Sportspeople from Worcester County, Massachusetts
Players of American football from Massachusetts
People from Holden, Massachusetts
American football offensive guards
American football offensive tackles
Rhode Island Rams football players
Georgia Bulldogs football players
Washington Redskins players
Minnesota Vikings players
Carolina Panthers players
Ottawa Redblacks players
Tampa Bay Bandits (2022) players
DC Defenders players